Craig Cash (born 11 September 1960) is an English comedian, actor, voice actor, director and BAFTA award-winning writer and producer. His best known works are in the television shows The Royle Family, The Fast Show, The Mrs Merton Show, Early Doors, Sunshine and most recently The Café, Rovers and After Hours. Cash took over from his Royle Family co-star Caroline Aherne as the narrator of Channel 4's Gogglebox after her death in 2016.

Cash won two BAFTA Television awards for his work on The Royle Family.

Biography

Career
Cash's father worked as a joiner and he grew up in Stockport. He rose to prominence in the late 1980s/early 1990s as a music radio DJ on south Manchester station KFM, where he worked with Caroline Aherne who had previously developed an Irish nun character, Sister Mary Immaculate. During this period he was also the manager of the band That Uncertain Feeling. In 1999 Cash performed uncredited duties as script editor on That Peter Kay Thing, a fact only revealed in 2004 when he moderated the DVD commentary.

As an actor Cash is best known for playing slightly dim-witted and affable working class northern men, particularly Dave Best in the BBC sitcom The Royle Family, which he co-wrote with Caroline Aherne.

He has also written for The Fast Show and for Aherne on The Mrs Merton Show. With Phil Mealey he wrote the BBC sitcom Early Doors. They went on to write the drama Sunshine, filmed in Marple, and first broadcast on BBC One in 2008. They founded the independent production company Jelly Legs, which produced later The Royle Family specials, "The New Sofa" and "The Golden Egg Cup", as well as Sunshine.

In 2011 Cash directed all six episodes of The Café, a show written by and starring his Royle Family co-star Ralf Little. From November 2013, Cash narrated the Channel 4 reality show Gogglebox when regular narrator Caroline Aherne was unavailable, and took on the role permanently when Aherne died on 2 July 2016. In 2015 he directed and executive produced the new Sky 1 comedy drama After Hours, starring Jaime Winstone and Ardal O'Hanlon, written by John Osborne and Molly Naylor.

From 2013 to 2017, Cash narrated adverts for sofa company Sofaworks (and its successor Sofology) which featured a three-toed sloth named Neal.

Cash won two BAFTA Television Awards for Best Situation Comedy his work on the Royle Family in 2000 and 2007.

Filmography

Personal life
Cash currently lives in Mellor, Greater Manchester. He is married to Stephanie Davies and the couple have two sons, Harry and Billy, who appeared in the episode of The Royle Family entitled "The Queen of Sheba". He is a lifelong supporter of Manchester City.

References

External links

Craig Cash at the British Film Institute

1960 births
Living people
Comedians from Manchester
Male actors from Manchester
BAFTA winners (people)
English male actors
English male comedians
English television directors
English radio DJs